Vahid Rahbani (born April 18, 1979) is an Iranian actor, director, playwright, translator and author. He is best known for his role as Mohammad in Gando (2019–2021). He earned two Crystal Simorgh nominations for his performances in Expediency (2021) and My Name Is Love (2023).

Filmography

Film

Television

Bibliography 

 Ed? (2022)

Awards and nominations

References

External links 

Iranian film directors
Iranian expatriates in Canada
Iranian male film actors
Iranian male television actors
Iranian male stage actors
People from Tehran
Living people
All articles with unsourced statements
1979 births